Fly by wire, Fly-by-wire or Fly by Wire may refer to:

 Fly-by-wire (FBW), electronic flight control system
 Fly by Wire (album), an album by Someone Still Loves You Boris Yeltsin
 Fly by Wire (book), a book about US Airways Flight 1549

See also 
 Drive by wire
 Power by wire
 Fly by light
 Fly by optics
 Fly wire (disambiguation)